José Boto (born 2 March 1966) is a Portuguese Sporting Director of Super League Greece club PAOK.

Professional biography 
Jose Boto was born on 2 March 1966, in Loures, Lisbon District. He started working as a manager with the local team of his birthplace, before moving on to Sacavenense, and then he joined Benfica.

From 2007 he became a scout, while in 2010 he became the head of the scouting department, a role he held until 2018, when he left the Portuguese club.

In 2018 he moved to Ukraine and became the sports director of Shakhtar Donetsk, taking on a significant share of responsibility for building the squad. Under his stewardship, Shakhtar won various titles and played in the UEFA Champions League.

Boto moved to PAOK as Sporting Director for two-and-a-half years.

References

External links
 
 Jose Boto on playmakerstats.com
 Jose Boto on paokfc.gr

1966 births
Living people
People from Loures
Portuguese football managers
S.L. Benfica non-playing staff
PAOK FC non-playing staff
Portuguese expatriate sportspeople in Greece
Portuguese expatriate sportspeople in Ukraine
FC Shakhtar Donetsk non-playing staff